Rosario Licata (born 16 January 1989) is an Italian footballer who plays as a defender for Italian Eccellenza Sicily club Unitas Sciacca.

Career
Born in Sciacca, Sicily, Licata was a player for Campobello di Mazara in 2006–07 Serie D. From 2007 to 2009, he was a player for the reserve team of Udinese Calcio.

Licata left for SPAL in July 2009. In July 2010, he joined Como along with Francesco Bossa. Licata was the starting defender for Como in first half of the season, which he made 9 starts. He only played 4 times in the second half of the season due to injury. In summer 2011, he was signed by Viareggio. Licata was a player for Portogruaro in 2012–13 Lega Pro Prima Divisione. Licata returned to Udine again on 1 July 2013. He was the member of Udinese B team in 2013 pre-season, which against Udinese A on 28 July and Clodiense on 4 August. On 5 August, he was on trial at Lega Pro 2nd Division newcomer Foggia. On 31 January 2014, he was signed by fellow fourth division club Sorrento. Both clubs had to finish 8th or above in order to avoid relegation to Serie D, as at the end of season the prime division and the second division of Lega Pro would be merged, thus Serie D would be the fourth division of the whole system again, be remain amateur (de facto semi-pro).

From 2014 to 2018, he played for several Serie D and Eccellenza (fourth- and fifth-tear) teams.

On 12 August 2018, he signed with Serie C club Cavese.

On 21 August 2019, he joined fifth-tier Eccellenza side Akragas.

References

External links
 AIC profile (data by www.football.it) 
 Lega Serie A profile 

1989 births
Living people
People from Sciacca
Italian footballers
Udinese Calcio players
Como 1907 players
S.P.A.L. players
F.C. Esperia Viareggio players
A.S.D. Portogruaro players
Calcio Foggia 1920 players
A.S.D. Sorrento players
Cavese 1919 players
Association football defenders
Serie C players
Serie D players
Footballers from Sicily
Sicily international footballers
Sportspeople from the Province of Agrigento